"Stars over Texas" is a song by American country music artist Tracy Lawrence. It was released in July 1996, as the third single from his album Time Marches On. Lawrence wrote the song with Larry Boone and Paul Nelson, and produced it with Flip Anderson

The song peaked at number 2 on the U.S. Billboard Hot Country Songs chart, and peaked at number 42 on the Canadian RPM Country Tracks chart.

Content
The song is a mid-tempo country waltz, in which the narrator states how long he plans to love this person, and to be true.

Music video

The music video, directed by Marc Ball, begins with someone opening the door of a grandfather clock, and stopping the hands. 

The rest of the video consists of Lawrence sitting on a stool with a guitar, and singing interspersed with shots of a woman putting on perfume and dancing with a man. 

The video ends with the grandfather clock starting again.

CD single extra content
The CD single included 30-second excerpts of "From What We Give", "Speed of a Fool", and "Somewhere Between the Moon and You", all from Time Marches On.  Lawrence wrote the song with Larry Boone and Paul Nelson.

Charts
"Stars over Texas" debuted at number 66 on the U.S. Billboard Hot Country Singles & Tracks for the week of July 27, 1996.

Year-end charts

References

1996 songs
1996 singles
Tracy Lawrence songs
Songs written by Larry Boone
Songs written by Tracy Lawrence
Songs written by Paul Nelson (songwriter)
Songs about Texas
Atlantic Records singles